Mullah Mohammad Farid Omar is an Afghan Taliban politician who is currently serving as Governor of Parwan province since 2021.

References

Living people
Year of birth missing (living people)
Taliban governors
Governors of Parwan Province